Nuclear physics may refer to:
 Nuclear physics
 High energy nuclear physics
 Nuclear Physics (journal)
 Nuclear Physics News
 Office of Nuclear Physics, United States Department of Energy

See also 
 Institute of Nuclear Physics (disambiguation)